Hypericum aciculare is a shrub in the genus Hypericum, in the section Brathys. It is an accepted name according to The Plant List and Tropicos.

Distribution
The species is found across Ecuador, in the regions Azuay and Loja. It is also less frequently found in Peru in Amazonas, Piura, and Cajamarca.

References

aciculare
Flora of Ecuador
Flora of Peru